Andrea Barberis (born 11 December 1993) is an Italian professional footballer who plays as a midfielder for  club Monza.

Club career

Early career 
Born in Genoa, Liguria, Italy, Barberis started his career at Finale Ligure. In the middle of 2010, he transferred at Lombard club Varese. In August 2011 Barberis was swapped with Jasmin Kurtić, both in temporary deal with option to buy. However, Palermo did not excise the option and paid Varese €200,000 for the counter-option of Kurtić. He played with Palermo's reserves initially, and was assigned kit number 53 for the first team. On 22 June 2012, Barberis left for Pisa, with Alex Benvenga returned to Varese.

Monza 
On 9 June 2020, newly promoted Serie B side Monza announced the signing of Barberis on a free contract. His first goal for the club was a 25-meter free kick on 4 May 2021, in a 2020–21 Serie B game against Lecce which ended in a 1–0 win.

Career statistics

References

External links
 
 Andrea Barberis at aic.football.it 
 Andrea Barberis A.C. Monza profile 
 
 

1993 births
Living people
Footballers from Genoa
Italian footballers
Association football midfielders
S.S.D. Varese Calcio players
Palermo F.C. players
Pisa S.C. players
F.C. Crotone players
A.C. Monza players
Serie A players
Serie B players
Serie C players
Italy youth international footballers